The (Roman Catholic) Diocese of Nakhon Ratchasima (Dioecesis Nakhonratchasimaensis) is located in the north-east of Thailand. It is a suffragan diocese of the Archdiocese of Thare and Nonseng.

The diocese covers an area of 41,148 km², covering 3 provinces of Thailand - Buriram, Chaiyaphum and Nakhon Ratchasima. As of 2001, of the 5.1 million citizen 5,204 are member of the Catholic Church. It is divided into 28 parishes, having 27 priests altogether.

History
The diocese was created on March 22, 1965, when the Vicariate Apostolic of Ubon was split. December 18, 1965 the Vicariate Apostolic of Nakhorn-Rajasima was elevated to a diocese.

Cathedral
The cathedral of the diocese is the Our Lady of Lourdes Cathedral (อาสนวิหารแม่พระประจักษ์ที่เมืองลูร์ด), located in the town Nakhon Ratchasima.

Bishops
Joseph Chusak Sirisut: appointed November 30, 2006
Joachim Phayao Manisap: May 30, 1977 - November 30, 2006 (resigned)
Alain Sauveur Ferdinand van Gaver, M.E.P: March 22, 1965 - May 30, 1977 (resigned)

External links
Website of the diocese
catholic-hierarchy.org

Nakhon Ratchasima
Nakhon Ratchasima
Buriram province
Chaiyaphum province
Nakhon Ratchasima province